Yelahanka Gate Anjaneya Temple is an ancient Hindu temple dedicated to Anjaneya in Avenue Road, Bangalore, India. The temple was built by Kempegowda the founder of Bangalore. The temple was named after the Yelahanka gate of the Bangalore Fort where it was built.

References

Hindu temples in Bangalore